Mitromica jeancateae is a species of small sea snail, marine gastropod mollusc in the family Costellariidae, the ribbed miters.

Description

Distribution

References

Costellariidae
Gastropods described in 1969